This is an episode list for the American sitcom Oh Baby, which ran on Lifetime from August 26, 1998, to March 4, 2000.

Series overview

Episodes

Season 1 (1998–1999)

Season 2 (1999–2000)

External links
 

Lists of American sitcom episodes